The Paraguay national football team represents Paraguay in men's international football competitions, and are controlled by the Paraguayan Football Association (Asociación Paraguaya de Fútbol). Paraguay is a member of CONMEBOL.  Their nickname is the Albirroja, or red and white. The Albirroja has qualified for eight FIFA World Cup competitions (1930, 1950, 1958, 1986, 1998, 2002, 2006 and 2010), with their best performance coming in 2010 when they reached the quarter-finals. A regular participant at the Copa América, Paraguay have been crowned champions of the competition on two occasions (in 1953 and 1979). Paraguay's highest FIFA World Rankings was 8th (March 2001) and their lowest was 103 (May 1995). Paraguay was awarded second place with Best Move of the Year in 1996 for their rise in the FIFA Rankings.

The national team's most successful period was under the coaching of Argentine Gerardo Martino, who was awarded with the South American Coach of the Year in 2007 and took Paraguay to the quarter-finals stage of the FIFA World Cup competition for the first time in history (in 2010) and also to the final of the 2011 Copa América, where Paraguay finished as runners-up. In Paraguay's entire history at the FIFA World Cup, only Carlos Gamarra and José Luis Chilavert hold the distinction of being selected as part of the All-Star Team, being for the 1998 edition. Paulo da Silva holds the most appearances for the national team with 148 matches and Roque Santa Cruz is the all-time leading goal scorer with 32 goals. Denis Caniza, who was present with the national team from 1996 to 2010, is the only player to have represented Paraguay in four consecutive FIFA World Cup competitions (1998, 2002, 2006, 2010).

History

The beginning (1900–1930)

Soon after the introduction of football in Paraguay by Williams Paats, the Liga Paraguaya de Futbol (today Asociación Paraguaya de Fútbol) was created in 1906. The first national football team was organized in 1910 when an invitation by the Argentine club Hércules of Corrientes was received to play a friendly match. Members of that first national team where F. Melián, G. Almeida, A. Rodríguez, M. Barrios, P. Samaniego, J. Morín, Z. Gadea, D. Andreani, C. Mena Porta, B. Villamayor, M. Rojas and E. Erico. The match ended in a 0–0 draw.

Because of the increasing number of invitations to play matches and international tournaments, the Asociación Paraguaya de Fútbol decided to officially create the national team and select the striped red and white jerseys that until this date remain as the official colours (taken from the Paraguayan flag). In late 1919, Paraguay accepted the invitation to play the 1921 Copa América and in order to prepare for that occasion a number of friendly matches were played between 1919 and the start of the tournament in 1921. The first of those friendly matches was a 5–1 loss against Argentina, and it marked the first international game by the Paraguay national football team. When the 1921 Copa América finally arrived, Paraguay surprised everybody by beating then three-time South American champions Uruguay by 2–1, being this the first match in an official competition for the Paraguayan football team. Paraguay eventually finished fourth in the tournament and became a regular participant of the tournament for the next editions.

In 1930, Paraguay participated in the first World Cup, organized by Uruguay. In the first round, Paraguay debuted and lost to the United States (0–3), to then defeat Belgium (1–0) with a goal by Luis Vargas Peña. Only one team was to advance from the group stage, and the U.S. left Paraguay behind.

First taste of success (1930–1970)

After strong participations in the Copa América tournaments of 1929, 1947 and 1949 (where Paraguay finished in second place), Paraguay was ready for their next World Cup competition.

The return to the World Cup was in 1950, where Paraguay faced Sweden and Italy in Group 3. Paraguay failed to advance to the next round after a 2–2 draw against Sweden and a 2–0 loss against Italy.

The first big success came in 1953 when Paraguay won the Copa América disputed in Peru. In their road to the championship, Paraguay defeated Chile (3–0), Bolivia (2–1) and Brazil (2–1); and tied against Ecuador (0–0), Peru (2–2) and Uruguay (2–2). Since Paraguay and Brazil were tied in points at the end of the tournament, a final playoff match was played between them, with Paraguay winning the final by 3–2. Key players of the campaign included Ángel Berni, Heriberto Herrera and Rubén Fernández. The coach was Manuel Fleitas Solich.

For the 1958 World Cup, Paraguay surprisingly qualified ahead of Uruguay (beating them 5–0 in the decisive game) with a team that contained a formidable attacking lineup with stars such as Juan Bautista Agüero, José Parodi, Jorge Lino Romero, Cayetano Ré and Florencio Amarilla. In their first game in Sweden, Paraguay were 3–2 up against France in a game they lost 7–3. A 3–2 win over Scotland and a 3–3 draw with Yugoslavia saw Paraguay finish third in their group.

The departure of several of their stars for European football (mainly Spain) resulted in a weakening of Paraguay's football fortunes somewhat, but they were only edged out by Mexico in the 1962 qualifiers.

More continental success (1970–1990)
Paraguay fell short in subsequent World Cup qualifying campaigns, but Copa América success (and that of one of its premier clubs Olimpia in the Copa Libertadores) in 1979 shored up Paraguay as a solid player on the continent.

The 1979 Copa América was won by Paraguay after finishing first in Group C (which had Uruguay and Ecuador as well) with two wins and two draws. In the semi-finals, Paraguay defeated Brazil by an aggregate score of 4–3. In the finals, Paraguay defeated Chile by an aggregate score of 3–1 to claim its second continental crown. Players such as Romerito, Carlos Alberto Kiese, Alicio Solalinde, Roberto Paredes, Hugo Ricardo Talavera and Eugenio Morel where an important part of the team, coached by Ranulfo Miranda.

Paraguay ended a 28-year absence from the World Cup in 1986 with a team starring Roberto Fernández in goal; Cesar Zabala, Rogelio Delgado and Juan Bautista Torales in defence; Jorge Amado Nunes and Vladimiro Schettina in midfield; midfield playmaker Romerito and strikers Roberto Cabañas, Ramón Ángel María Hicks and Rolando Chilavert (the older brother of José Luis Chilavert). In first round matches, Paraguay defeated Iraq (1–0, goal scored by Romerito) and then tied Mexico (1–1, goal scored by Romerito) and Belgium (2–2, both goals scored by Roberto Cabañas). They reached the second round where they were beaten 3–0 by England.

The golden generation (1998–2011)
A drought followed once again, as Paraguay failed to reach the 1990 and 1994 World Cups.

In 1992, Paraguay won the South American Pre-Olympic tournament, which guaranteed a spot in the 1992 Summer Olympics football competition. In the Olympics, Paraguay finished second in its group and were eliminated by Ghana in the quarter-finals. The most important aspect of that Paraguay team was the emergence of new young players like Carlos Gamarra, Celso Ayala, José Luis Chilavert, Francisco Arce and José Cardozo, which became part of the "golden generation" that led Paraguay to three straight World Cups and good performances in continental competitions, establishing Paraguay as one of the top teams in South America alongside Brazil, Argentina, and Uruguay.

1998 FIFA World Cup

Paraguay concluded the qualifiers for the 1998 World Cup in second position, one point below Argentina.

Coached by the Brazilian Paulo César Carpegiani, the Albirroja returned to the World Cup finals for the first time since 1986. The squad featured experienced players. Paraguay were drawn into Group D, alongside Bulgaria, Nigeria and Spain.

Paraguay drew their first two matches 0–0, against Bulgaria and Spain. They then faced to face Nigeria, who has already qualified for the second round after winning their first two matches. Paraguay won 3–1 and finished in second position in the group.

Paraguay met France in the second round on 28 June. France were without Zinedine Zidane, and were held 0–0 by Paraguay for 90 minutes. In the 114th minute of extra-time, Laurent Blanc scored to eliminate Paraguay on the golden goal rule. Defender Carlos Gamarra and goalkeeper and captain José Luís Chilavert were selected as part of the 1998 All-Star Team.

1999 and 2001 Copa América

Paraguay were hosts of the 1999 Copa América, played in four cities throughout the country. Head coach Ever Hugo Almeida selected an experienced squad, with the majority of the players having been present at the 1998 World Cup.  Grouped with Bolivia, Japan and Peru, the Albirroja played their first match of the competition, drawing 0–0 against Bolivia. On 2 July, Paraguay faced Japan and sealed a 4–0 victory. In Paraguay's third and last group-stage fixture against Peru, Paraguay won 1–0. The Albirroja topped the group with seven points. Paraguay were drawn against Uruguay at the quarter-final stage. The match was decided via a penalty shootout, which saw Paraguay defeated 5–3. Following the conclusion of the competition, striker Roque Santa Cruz was awarded with the 1999 Paraguayan Footballer of the Year award.

In the 2001 Copa America, head coach Sergio Markarián selected a squad of mostly domestic based players. Paraguay were drawn against Peru, Mexico and Brazil. In their opening fixture on 12 July, the fixture ended 3–3. On 15 July, Paraguay drew 0–0 with Mexico in their second group stage fixture. Paraguay then faced Brazil on 18 July in their last group stage fixture. Brazil won 3–1 and eliminated Paraguay, who had obtained just two points at the competition.

2002 FIFA World Cup
Paraguay began its 2002 FIFA World Cup qualification campaign in March 2000, suffering a 2–0 away defeat against Peru. One month later, they defeated Uruguay 1–0. On 3 June 2000, Paraguay secured a 3–1 home victory against Ecuador, before Paraguay were defeated 3–1 away against Chile. On 18 July 2000, Paraguay earned a 2–1 home victory against Brazil. Paraguay then drew the next two fixtures. Paraguay then earned four consecutive wins — against Venezuela, Colombia (2–0), Peru (5–1), and Uruguay (1–0) — to move into second position in qualifying.

Paraguay fell 2–1 away against Ecuador.  Paraguay defeated Chile 1–0. Paraguay were defeated 2–0 away against Brazil. Paraguay defeated Bolivia 5–1 at home. One month later Paraguay drew Argentina 2–2. Paraguay maintained second position in the table.  Paraguay were then defeated 3–1 away against Venezuela and 4–0 against Colombia. Paraguay finished in fourth position after Round 18, with 30 points, qualifying for the 2002 FIFA World Cup. Both José Saturnino Cardozo and Carlos Humberto Paredes were in the top 10 leading goal scorers of the qualifiers. Cardozo ranking fifth, with six goals in fourteen matches, and Paredes ranking tenth, having scored five goals in sixteen matches.

Paraguay came into the 2002 FIFA World Cup tournament with most of their players from France 98, as José Luís Chilavert would captain the Albirroja at the tournament. Cesare Maldini's appointing as coach in January 2002 had caused controversy as domestic managers were overlooked (prompting the managers union to try to unsuccessfully expel him for immigration breaches).

Paraguay were drawn into Group B with Spain, South Africa and Slovenia. The Albirroja would face South Africa in their opening group stage match on 2 June, with a match that tied at 2–2. Paraguay faced Spain in their next fixture on 7 June. Spain defeated Paraguay 3–1. In Paraguay's third group stage fixture against Slovenia, Paraguay won the match at 3–1.  Although Paraguay and South Africa had finished with four points each, the Albirroja progressed due to goal difference.
Paraguay were then drawn against Germany at the round of 16 stages. Germany, who had been the more dominant side throughout the match, scored in the 88th minute to win the match, ending Paraguay's tournament.

2004 Copa América
Coach Carlos Jara Saguier took a relatively young squad to the 2004 Copa América, with the majority of players tied to clubs of the Primera División Paraguaya. Paraguay had been drawn into Group C, with Brazil, Costa Rica and Chile. A penalty sealed Paraguay's 1–0 victory in their first group-stage match against Costa Rica. Paraguay earned a 1–1 draw with Chile in the following match. In Paraguay's fixture against Brazil, Paraguay earned a 2–1 victory, which saw Paraguay top the group as undefeated, with seven points. Paraguay were drawn against Uruguay in the quarter-finals. A 3–1 Uruguay victory eliminated Paraguay from the competition.

2006 FIFA World Cup

Paraguay began the 2006 FIFA World Cup qualification with three wins in their first four fixtures in 2003. After losing 4–1 to Peru, Paraguay notched consecutive wins against Uruguay (4–1), Chile (1–0) to reach first position of the table. In 2004, Paraguay drew 0–0 against Brazil and lost 2–1 to Bolivia. Paraguay got their only win of 2004 against Venezuela a 1–0. Paraguay ended the year with a 1–0 defeat against Uruguay. In 2005, Paraguay lost to Ecuador and then defeated Chile 2–1. In their next fixture, Brazil defeated Paraguay 4–1. Paraguay defeated Bolivia 4–1, and Argentina 1–0 for Paraguay's first official victory over Argentina. They defeated Venezuela 1–0. In round 18, Paraguay were defeated 1–0 at home against Colombia. Paraguay concluded the qualifiers in fourth position, qualifying for their third consecutive World Cup. José Cardozo finished second in goals scored with seven.

Head coach Aníbal Ruiz took with him 8 European based players and 11 South American based players, including captain Carlos Gamarra, to Germany for the 2006 tournament. This was Paraguay's third consecutive FIFA World Cup tournament, and the team had experienced players within the side.

Paraguay were drawn into Group B alongside England, Sweden and Trinidad and Tobago. Paraguay faced England in their opening group stage match on 10 June. England managed to hold onto a 1–0 lead to earn a victory.  They faced Sweden on 15 June in a match which Sweden eliminated Paraguay after just two group-stage matches without the Albirroja scoring a single goal. Paraguay's only compensation came in their third and last group stage fixture on against Trinidad and Tobago on 20 June, Paraguay's 2–0 victory. Paraguay finished third in their group. Paraguay's group stage elimination made them the only South American national team which did not advance beyond the first round. Upon the conclusion of Paraguay's 2006 FIFA World Cup campaign, Aníbal Ruiz resigned as head coach and Raúl Vicente Amarilla was assigned as the interim coach.

Paraguay's national squad underwent a major transition after Germany 2006 because of the retirement of key players including José Luis Chilavert. In 2007, Argentine Gerardo "Tata" Martino was designated as head-coach.

2007 Copa América

Gerardo Martino took with him a relatively experienced squad to Venezuela, with Darío Verón, Claudio Morel Rodríguez, Carlos Bonet, Julio Manzur, Paulo da Silva, Aureliano Torres, Roque Santa Cruz and captain Julio César Cáceres all re-appearing for the national team, and newcomers Enrique Vera, Óscar Cardozo and the Argentine-born Jonathan Santana were appearing for Paraguay in their first major tournaments. The competition also proved to be one of the last national team involvements from veteran Nelson Cuevas. Paraguay were drawn into Group C, alongside Argentina, Colombia, and the USA. In Paraguay's first fixture, they would defeat Colombia 5–0 after a hat-trick from Roque Santa Cruz and a double from Salvador Cabañas. In Paraguay's second fixture against the US, Édgar Barreto opened the scoring in the 29th minute just before the USA's Ricardo Clark would level the scores in the 35th minute. Paraguay would win the match 3–1 after a goal from Óscar Cardozo and a 92nd minute free kick from Salvador Cabañas would seal the game for the Albirroja. With both Paraguay and Argentina having obtained six points and qualifying from beyond their Group C, the two teams faced in their last group stage fixture with a less strengthened side, Roque Santa Cruz, Édgar Barreto, Cristian Riveros and Paolo da Silva all commencing on the bench as Nelson Cuevas would gain his first appearance of the competition and Aldo Bobadilla would play a full 90-minutes of the fixture, replacing Justo Villar for the second time in the tournament. A 79th minute Javier Mascherano goal was enough to seal a 1–0 victory for Argentina, as Paraguay advanced to the knock-out stages to face Mexico. Mexico had already beaten Brazil in the group stage and had finished in first place of their respective Group B with seven points. After Paraguayan goal keeper Aldo Bobadilla had earned a straight red card in the 3rd minute, Paraguay conceded a penalty in the 5th minute and eventually found themselves down 3–0 at half-time. Mexico would score another three more goals, thrashing Paraguay 6–0 and ending their Copa América campaign.

2010 FIFA World Cup

Paraguay commenced their 2010 World Cup qualifying campaign with a 0–0 away draw against Peru. Paraguay followed this draw with four consecutive wins — against Urugauay (1–0), Ecuador (5–1), Chile (3–0), and Brazil (2–0). These victories placed Paraguay in first position of the CONMEBOL table in four matches, and Paraguay remained in first position of the CONMEBOL table for nine consecutive rounds (from round 4 to round 12).  Paraguay lost for the first time in qualifying in a 4–2 away defeat against Bolivia.

Paraguay travelled to Argentina. 1–1 was how it finished. Days later, a 2–0 home victory against Venezuela as Paraguay remained in first position of the CONMEBOL table. Paraguay then earned two 1–0 victories against Colombia and Peru. The results keeping Paraguay in first place of the CONMEBOL table as 2008 concluded. Paraguay's qualification campaign in 2009 commenced with a 2–0 away loss against Uruguay and a 1–1 away draw against Ecuador, By June, Paraguay suffered a 2–0 home defeat at the hands of Chile, Paraguay were defeated 2–1 away against Brazil. In the last four matches of the qualification campaign, where which three of the four fixtures would be played at home, Paraguay earned a 1–0 home victory against Bolivia. Qualification was secured in the next fixture against Argentina on 9 September, when Paraguay won 1–0. Paraguay concluded the qualification campaign with a 2–1 away victory against Venezuela and a 2–0 home loss against Colombia. Paraguay concluded the qualification campaign with 33 points, as Salvador Cabañas finished in sixth position of the leading goal scorers, having scored six goals.

Paraguay had an experienced side with Roque Santa Cruz, Édgar Barreto, Carlos Bonet, Enrique Vera, Cristian Riveros, Nelson Valdez and Paulo da Silva. Paraguay had qualified for their fourth consecutive FIFA World Cup, and the 2010 edition proved to be a record fourth consecutive World Cup for Denis Caniza. The final squad consisted of 9 European based players.
Paraguay were drawn into Group F alongside Italy, Slovakia and New Zealand. Paraguay faced Italy in their opening match and drew 1–1, after taking the lead in the 39th minute. They then beat Slovakia 2–0 and played out a 0–0 draw with New Zealand, to finish first in the group.

Paraguay were drawn against Japan in the second round, and won a penalty shoot-out 5–3 after a 0–0 draw. The win meant that Paraguay advanced to the last eight for the first time.
The Albirroja were drawn against Spain at the quarter-final stage. Paraguayan goalkeeper Justo Villar saved a penalty kick, but Spain scored in the 83rd minute to win 1–0, and went on to win the tournament. After the match, Gerardo Martino stated that he would be leaving his position at the end of his contract.

2011 Copa América

At the 2011 Copa America, Paraguay were drawn into Group B with Brazil, Venezuela and Ecuador. Paraguay drew their opening group stage match 0–0 with Ecuador. Paraguay leveled with Brazil 2–2, as Paraguay would settle for their second draw of the tournament. Paraguay played out a 3–3 draw with Venezuela. Paraguay concluded the group stage phase with three points from three matches, as the group's third-place finisher and the competition's second-best third-place finisher in the group stage.

Paraguay were drawn against Brazil at the quarter final stages. The match was decided via a penalty shoot out. Paraguay won the penalty shoot out 2–0. Paraguay then faced Venezuela in the semi-final. Paraguay won 5–3 via their second consecutive penalty shoot out, to send Paraguay to the final. Paraguay faced Uruguay in the final, the first time that Paraguay reached the final since the 1979 Copa América. Paraguay lost 3–0. Paraguayan goalkeeper Justo Villar was awarded as the Best goalkeeper of the tournament. Gerardo Martino resigned soon afterwards as coach of the Albirroja.

2014 FIFA World Cup qualification

Francisco Arce took charge of the national team for the qualifiers. In Rounds 1 and 2 in October 2011, Paraguay were defeated 2–0 away. Four days later, Paraguay drew with Uruguay 1–1. Paraguay earned their first win of the qualifiers when they defeated Ecuador 2–1. Fourth position was the highest ranking that Paraguay achieved throughout the qualifiers, as the national team faced a series of losses.

Paraguay were defeated 2–0 against Chile and 3–1 to Bolivia. Francisco Arce departed as coach in 2012 after Paraguay's loss against Bolivia, and was replaced by Gerardo Pelusso. Paraguay were defeated 3–1 against Argentina, 2–0 against Venezuela, and 2–0 against Colombia. This string of losses placed Paraguay at the bottom of the table.

Paraguay ended their losing streak when they defeated Peru 1–0, only their second win of the qualifiers. Paraguay's then tied Uruguay 1–1.  Paraguay were defeated 4–1 against Ecuador.
In Round 13, Paraguay lost 2–1 to Chile in a match where Roque Santa Cruz's goal brought his tally to 26 which made him the all-time leading goal scorer of the Paraguay national team's history. By this time, Gerardo Pelusso had departed and coach Víctor Genes would ultimately be in charge until the qualifiers were concluded. Paraguay next defeated Bolivia 4–0. However, a 5–2 defeat against Argentina officially eliminated Paraguay from qualifying.

Paraguay's last two matches in October 2013 saw then face Venezuela and Colombia. The match concluded 1–1.  In Paraguay's last fixture of the qualifiers in Round 18, they lost to Colombia 2–1. Paraguay finished in ninth position of the table, having gained just 12 points from three wins and having been defeated ten times. The 2014 FIFA World Cup qualification campaign proved to be unsuccessful. Throughout the duration of the qualifiers, Paraguay changed coaches three times.

2015 Copa América

Paraguay's campaign in the 2015 Copa América was much more successful than their qualifying campaign to Brazil. In this competition, Paraguay made it to the semi-finals, defeating Brazil in quarter-finals via penalty shootouts, after the score being 1–1, although they were eliminated by Argentina, by a score of 6–1.

2016 Copa América Centenario
Prior to the competition, the Paraguayan press had labeled Roque Santa Cruz, Nelson Haedo, Paulo da Silva and Justo Villar as histórics, being the only four experienced and veteran players in the squad selected for the competition. Santa Cruz suffered an injured and was later replaced by Antonio Sanabria.

Following an unsuccessful campaign, Ramón Díaz announced his resignation as coach of the Albirroja in a press conference at the Estadio Defensores del Chaco after returning to the country. He had already received criticism from former Albirroja great José Luís Chilavert, who stated that the team was managed based on "friendship" in the federation due to corruption and opined that Díaz is more of an office person. José Cardozo, former Albirroja leading goal scorer and current coach of Chiapas in Mexico, also expressed his dissatisfaction with the Albirroja. He stated that: "There are players that do not even know our national anthem" and "We used to play until we would suffer severe injuries, and we performed because we loved the Albirroja. Today, someone has pain in their stomach and does not want to train". "Carlos Gamarra and Francisco Arce played many times with busted ankles, and I once played with a damaged knee" remembered Cardozo. Former Albirroja World Cup veteran Celso Ayala spoke to HOY.com and mentioned that "Any team beats us. In the Albirroja, we've stopped kicking, blocking and heading. Uruguay, for instance, never forgets about its roots, and we have to be like them".

Team image

Paraguay traditionally wears red and white shirts and blue shorts and socks and away colours are originally blue but they wear all white since they wear manufactured by German brand Puma after their termination from the Adidas brand. They never used their away colours when they were playing in the 2010 FIFA World Cup in South Africa.

Results and fixtures

2022

2023

Coaching staff

Players

Current squad
The following players were called up for the friendly match against Chile on 27 March 2023.

Caps and goals current as of 19 November 2022, after the match against Colombia.

Recent call-ups
The following players have received a call-up within the past 12 months:

{{nat fs r player|no=|pos=DF|name=Alan Benítez|age=|caps=5|goals=0|club=[[Free agent|''Unattached]]|clubnat=|latest=v. , 10 June 2022}}

COV Withdrew due to COVID-19
INJ Withdrew due to injury
PRE Preliminary squad
RET Retired from the national team
SUS Suspended
WD Withdrew from the squad

Player records

Players in bold are still active at international level.

Most caps

Most goals

Competitive record
FIFA World Cup

 Champions   Runners-up   Third place   Fourth place  

*Draws include knockout matches decided via penalty shoot-out.

Copa América

Pan American Games

Head-to-head record

Below is a result summary of all matches Paraguay have played against FIFA recognized teams.

Honours
 Official 
 South American Championship / Copa América: Champions (2): 1953, 1979
 Runners-up (6): 1922, 1929, 1947, 1949, 1963, 2011
 Third place (7): 1923, 1924, 1925, 1939, 1946, 1959 (Argentina), 1983
 Fourth place (7): 1921, 1926, 1937, 1942, 1967, 1989, 2015

South American Tournaments
 Copa Chevallier Boutell (vs ): Winners (2): 1925 (shared), 1945 (II)
 Copa Félix Bogado (vs ): Winners (2): 1977, 1983
 Copa Trompowski (vs ): Winners: 1950
 Copa Artigas (vs ): Winners: 1975 (shared)
 Copa Paz del Chaco (vs ): Winners (6): 1963, 1977, 1980, 1991, 1995, 2003

Friendlies
 Copa Boquerón: Winners: 1988
 Lunar New Year Cup: Winners:''' 1968

See also

Paraguay national under-23 football team
Paraguay national under-20 football team
Paraguay national under-17 football team
Paraguay national futsal team
Football in Paraguay

References

External links

Official site of the Paraguayan Football Association
Paraguay FIFA profile
RSSSF archive of results 1919–2004
Planet World Cup archive of results in the World Cup
Planet World Cup archive of squads in the World Cup
Planet World Cup archive of results in the World Cup qualifiers
Paraguayan Football Site

 
South American national association football teams
Football in Paraguay